Sky Raider or Skyraider may refer to:

Aircraft
Douglas A-1 Skyraider attack aircraft
Flying K Sky Raider, ultralight aircraft
Worldwide Ultralite Skyraider S/S, ultralight aircraft

Entertainment
Sky Raider, a 1978 arcade game by Atari, Inc.